Queenmagic, Kingmagic is a novel by Ian Watson published in 1986.

Plot summary
Queenmagic, Kingmagic is a novel in which the hero and heroines are pawns in a game world involving chess, and travel to worlds of other games.

Reception
Dave Langford reviewed Queenmagic, Kingmagic for White Dwarf #83, and stated that "The expected unexpected finale is very Watsonesque."

Reviews
Review by Faren Miller (1986) in Locus, #307 August 1986
Review by Chris Morgan (1986) in Fantasy Review, November 1986
Review by Martyn Taylor (1986) in Vector 135
Review by Orson Scott Card (1988) in The Magazine of Fantasy & Science Fiction, October 1988
Review by Baird Searles (1988) in Isaac Asimov's Science Fiction Magazine, December 1988
Review by Michael Abbott (2010) in Vector 262 Winter 2010

References

1986 British novels
British science fiction novels
Novels about chess
Victor Gollancz Ltd books